Causeway is a 2022 American drama film directed by Lila Neugebauer in her feature directorial debut and written by Ottessa Moshfegh, Luke Goebel, and Elizabeth Sanders. The film stars Jennifer Lawrence (who also produced), Brian Tyree Henry, Linda Emond, Jayne Houdyshell, Stephen McKinley Henderson, and Russell Harvard. It follows a soldier struggling to adjust to her life after returning home to New Orleans.

The film had its world premiere at the 47th Toronto International Film Festival on September 10, 2022. It was released in select cinemas on October 28, 2022, then had a streaming release on November 4, 2022 on Apple TV+. The film received positive reviews from critics, who praised the performances of Lawrence and Henry. Among other accolades, Henry was nominated for Best Supporting Actor at the 95th Academy Awards.

Plot
Lynsey, a U.S. soldier, experiences a traumatic brain injury after an IED explosion during her tour in Afghanistan which forces her to return home in New Orleans. She struggles to return to her daily life with her mother as she waits for her wish to return for redeployment. Her doctor is reluctant to sign her waiver to return as he feels that trauma is a strong link to her depression.  As she improves with rehabilitation, she becomes unlikely friends with James, an auto mechanic, who also has physical and mental trauma after a car accident in which his nephew was killed on the Lake Pontchartrain Causeway. Causeway, the title of the movie, is a metaphor for the journeys in the film as it may be "terrifying to drive across when you're on it, you can't see".

Cast

 Jennifer Lawrence as Lynsey
 Brian Tyree Henry as James Aucoin
 Linda Emond as Gloria, Lynsey's mother
 Jayne Houdyshell as Sharon, a caretaker
 Stephen McKinley Henderson as Dr. Lucas
 Russell Harvard as Justin, Lynsey's brother
 Sean Carvajal as Santiago, a mechanic
 Fred Weller as Rick, the pool cleaner boss
 Neal Huff as Neuropsychologist

Production
In April 2019, it was announced Jennifer Lawrence and Brian Tyree Henry had joined the cast of an untitled drama film, with Lila Neugebauer directing from a screenplay by Elizabeth Sanders. Lawrence, Justine Polsky, Eli Bush and Scott Rudin initially served as producers under their Excellent Cadaver and IAC Films banners, respectively, and A24 distributed it.

Production began in the summer of 2019 in New Orleans, but was delayed due to Hurricane Barry. Production restarted in March 2020, but was once again delayed due to the COVID-19 pandemic and was completed in the summer of 2021. Lawrence and Henry continued to workshop the script together during the pandemic as a result of their chemistry and to further enrich it as their scenes were seen as the most compelling of the film.

In April 2021, following allegations of abuse, Scott Rudin stepped back as a producer from the project. On December 30, 2021, the WGA awarded final screenplay credit for the film to both Sanders and the team of Ottessa Moshfegh and Luke Goebel.

Release
In July 2022, it was announced Apple TV+ would distribute the film. The film had its world premiere at the 2022 Toronto International Film Festival on September 10, 2022. The European premiere was held on October 8, 2022, at the BFI London Film Festival. It had a limited theatrical release on October 28, 2022, and was released on Apple TV+ on November 4, 2022.

Reception 

On Rotten Tomatoes, the film holds an approval rating of 84% based on 165 reviews, with an average rating of 7.1/10. The website's critics consensus reads "Causeway takes a powerfully subdued look at the lingering effects of trauma, led by gripping performances from Jennifer Lawrence and Brian Tyree Henry." On Metacritic, which uses a weighted average, the film has a score of 66 out of 100 based on 39 critics, indicating "generally favorable reviews".

Wendy Ide of The Observer awarded 4 stars out of 5, praised the film and wrote " this is a subdued, sensitive drama and Lawrence is phenomenal, giving the kind of wary, reined-in performance that made such a compelling impression in her breakthrough film, Winter’s Bone." In a B+ review for Consequence, Mary Siroky wrote: "while one of the few downsides of Causeway is the lingering desire to spend more time with these characters, the film holds an excellent return to form for Jennifer Lawrence and makes a stellar case for many more leading man roles for Brian Tyree Henry," further praising Lawrence's performance as "gripping" in comparison to her work in Winter's Bone and that Henry "is so grounded here that there are moments we feel like we are intruding into his life." Anna Smith for Time Out gave it 4 out of 5 stars review and wrote: "both actors are terrific: Lawrence is understated and compelling while Henry is by turns sympathetic, amusing and heartbreaking...Causeway will offer plenty for fans of thoughtful, quality dramas that touch on humanity, trauma, connection and the kindness of strangers."

In a review for The Austin Chronicle, Jenny Nulf wrote: "Watching Jennifer Lawrence in a film that allows her to showcase her skills at full force after so many years without her is a welcome reminder that she’s one of our greatest living actresses [...] Lawrence and Henry do an incredible job at dancing around each other, soft smiles to communicate their pain and hardships without relying on overwritten exposition. Director Lila Neugebauer (best known in the theatre space, but who also worked on the critically acclaimed series Maid) manages to keep the tone understated, focusing on the nuances of Lawrence and Henry’s performances that carry the weight of the heavy script." Adam White, giving the film 4 out of 5 stars in a review for The Independent, praised Lawrence's performance as "brilliant" (stating it as a reminder of previous acclaimed naturalistic work) and that "Henry lends each hushed gap in James’s tale the feel of a sledgehammer."

Accolades

References

External links
 

American war drama films
Films about veterans
Films about post-traumatic stress disorder
Films shot in New Orleans
A24 (company) films
Apple TV+ original films
2022 directorial debut films
2022 independent films
2020s American films
Films scored by Alex Somers